Once a Gentleman is a 1930 American comedy film directed by James Cruze and starring Edward Everett Horton, Lois Wilson and Francis X. Bushman. A butler goes on vacation, where he is wrongly supposed to be a wealthy man.

Cast
 Edward Everett Horton as Oliver 
 Lois Wilson as Mrs. Mallin 
 Francis X. Bushman as Bannister 
 King Baggot as Van Warner 
 Emerson Treacy as Junior 
 George Fawcett as Colonel Breen 
 Frederick Sullivan as Wadsworth 
 Gertrude Short as Dolly 
 Estelle Bradley as Gwen 
 William J. Holmes as Ogelthrope 
 Cyril Chadwick as Jarvis 
 Evelyn Pierce as Natalie 
 Drew Demorest as Timson 
 William H. O'Brien as Reeves 
 Charles Coleman as Wuggins

References

Bibliography
 Pitts, Michael R. Poverty Row Studios, 1929–1940: An Illustrated History of 55 Independent Film Companies, with a Filmography for Each. McFarland & Company, 2005.

External links
 

1930 films
1930 comedy films
1930s English-language films
American comedy films
Films directed by James Cruze
American black-and-white films
1930s American films